Gothic War may refer to:
Gothic War (248–253), battles and plundering carried out by the Goths and their allies in the Roman Empire.
Gothic War (367–369), a war of Thervingi against the Eastern Roman Empire in which the Goths retreated to Montes Serrorum
Gothic War (376–382), Thervingi and Greuthungi against the Roman Empire
Gothic War (401–403), a war Visigoths against the Western Roman Empire that included the Battle of Pollentia
Visigothic War of 436, Visigoths against the Western Roman Empire
Gothic War (535–554), Ostrogoths against the Eastern Roman Empire

See also
Gothic and Vandal warfare
Gothic Wars